Independence High School is a public high school located at 5175 E. Refugee Road, Columbus, Ohio. It is a part of Columbus City Schools.

The school colors are red, white and blue.  The school nickname is the 76ers.

Notable alumni
 Joe Cooper, Ohio State and Calgary Stampeders linebacker
 Eric Crozier, former Major League Baseball player, Toronto Blue Jays
 Kenny Gregory, basketball player, University of Kansas
 Roger Harper, former National Football League player, Dallas Cowboys and Atlanta Falcons
 DeAngelo Smith, former National Football League player, Cleveland Browns

Notes and references

External links
 District Website

High schools in Columbus, Ohio
Public high schools in Ohio